Dávid Attila Gróf (born 17 April 1989) is a Hungarian footballer who plays as a goalkeeper for Super League 1 team Levadiakos. Gróf started his senior career with Scottish club Hibernian, making one appearance during the 2008–09 season before being released from his contract. He subsequently played in England for Notts County, Tamworth, Mansfield Town and Walsall.

Career

Hibernian 
Gróf started his professional career with Hibernian, making his professional debut in their 4–3 defeat by Greenock Morton in the Scottish League Cup on 26 August 2008.

Later that season, Gróf was convicted of a drink driving offence and was consequently banned from driving for two years. Hibs also disciplined the player, who made a public apology through the club's website. He was relegated to the status of fourth choice goalkeeper at Hibs after the arrival of Grzegorz Szamotulski during January 2009. Gróf went on trial at West Bromwich Albion, but was released by Hibs towards the end of the 2008–09 season, despite having 18 months left on his contract.

Following his release by Hibs, Gróf trained with English League Two side Gillingham, featuring in a reserve team match against Lewes.

Notts County 
Gróf went on trial with League One club Notts County in July 2010. He agreed a deal to sign for the club, subject to medical. On the same day as the deal with Notts County was announced, Gróf played for Tamworth in a friendly match against Aberdeen. He completed the move on 26 July. On 4 August 2010 it was confirmed that Gróf would be joining The Lambs on a one-month loan deal in time for the new season. Just six days later Gróf was recalled by his parent club.

Gróf signed on loan with Conference National club Mansfield Town on 31 January 2011. Grof played an integral part in Mansfield's FA Trophy run which saw the Stags lose to Darlington in the final at Wembley on 7 May. Despite not being permitted to play in the final itself, Grof became a hero to the Mansfield fans due to his performances in both the FA Trophy and the Conference National, and appeared before the game against Darlington to a standing ovation from the 15000 strong travelling Mansfield fans.

Despite rave reviews of his performances at Mansfield, Grof was waived by Notts County at the end of the season alongside defender Graeme Lee..

Walsall 
Following a trial spell, Gróf signed a one-year contract with Football League One side Walsall in July 2011. Gróf made his full Walsall debut against Bournemouth, keeping a cleen sheet in a 2–0 win, and then made his home debut the following game—a Football League Trophy first round fixture against Shrewsbury Town, which Walsall won 2–1. On 17 March 2013, Gróf announced that he was moving to France to pursue a career away from the Saddlers, having fallen down the pecking order at Walsall behind a string of successive loan goalkeepers manager Dean Smith had signed due to his poor early season form.

Clermont 
On 18 March 2013, Gróf began his trial with Clermont, successfully completing the first part of his medical and training with the first team later that day.

Germany 
In November 2013, Gróf moved to German side Goslarer SC, where he remained until the end of the season before signing for Berliner AK.

Ferencváros
On 16 June 2020, he became champion with Ferencváros by beating Budapest Honvéd FC at the Hidegkuti Nándor Stadion on the 30th match day of the 2019–20 Nemzeti Bajnokság I season.

Debrecen and Levadiakos 
On 4 September 2020, he was transferred to the Debrecen on loan. He became a player of the On 4September 2020, he was transferred to the Debrecen on loan. He became a player of the Debrecen team from July 1, 2021, the club exercised the option after the end of the one-year loan contract.

On 31 January 2023, Gróf became a new Levadiakos player.

Personal life 
Gróf was born in Budapest. His father Attila also played professionally as a goalkeeper, for Vasas Budapest, Újpesti Dózsa, Videoton.

Gróf was convicted of a drink driving offence and banned from driving for two years. He was charged with another drink driving offence in April 2009.

Married to Klaudia Gróf-Komsa on 3 August 2017. She is a Hungarian handball player.

Club statistics

Updated to games played as of 15 May 2022.

References

External links 

1989 births
Living people
Footballers from Budapest
Hungarian footballers
Hungarian expatriate footballers
Expatriate footballers in Scotland
Expatriate footballers in England
Expatriate footballers in Germany
Hungarian expatriate sportspeople in Scotland
Hungarian expatriate sportspeople in England
Hungarian expatriate sportspeople in Germany
Association football goalkeepers
Hibernian F.C. players
Notts County F.C. players
Tamworth F.C. players
Mansfield Town F.C. players
Walsall F.C. players
Berliner AK 07 players
Csákvári TK players
Budapest Honvéd FC players
National League (English football) players
English Football League players
Nemzeti Bajnokság I players
Ferencvárosi TC footballers
Debreceni VSC players